Lü Chuanzan (September 1932 – 16 April 2018) was a People's Republic of China politician who served as Chairman of Hebei Provincial People's Congress, and Chairman of Hebei CPPCC. He was a delegate to the 6th National People's Congress (1983–1988), 7th National People's Congress (1988–1993) and 8th National People's Congress (1993–1998).

He was born in September 1932 in Muping District, Yantai, Shandong Province. He joined the Chinese Communist Party in June 1955, and graduated from the Political Economics Department of Renmin University of China. 

Lü Chuanzan died on 16 April 2018 in Shijiazhuang, Hebei, aged 85.

References

1932 births
2018 deaths
People's Republic of China politicians from Shandong
Chinese Communist Party politicians from Shandong
Delegates to the 6th National People's Congress
Delegates to the 7th National People's Congress
Delegates to the 8th National People's Congress
Members of the 9th Chinese People's Political Consultative Conference
Deputy Communist Party secretaries of Hebei
Chairmen of the CPPCC Hebei Committee
Renmin University of China alumni
People from Muping District